The New Castle Historic Commercial District in New Castle, Kentucky is a historic district which was listed on the National Register of Historic Places in 2016.

The  listed area includes 29 contributing buildings.  It includes the Italianate-style Henry County Courthouse, which was separately listed on the National Register in 1977.

New Castle's historic center is somewhat different from those of other Kentucky county seat towns, as it never had a railroad.  Railroads reached most county seats by around 1920 and shaped development significantly.  Most of the contributing buildings in the district are one- or two-story brick structures;  three are log buildings.

See also
 Eminence Historic Commercial District: the other historic district in Henry County, Kentucky
 National Register of Historic Places listings in Henry County, Kentucky

References

National Register of Historic Places in Henry County, Kentucky
Historic districts on the National Register of Historic Places in Kentucky
Commercial buildings on the National Register of Historic Places in Kentucky